Sisterhood Everlasting is the fifth and last novel in Ann Brashares's "Sisterhood" series. The story concludes the adventures of four girls who share a pair of "magical" pants that fit each one of them perfectly, despite their vastly different shapes and sizes. This is the fifth book in The Sisterhood of the Traveling Pants series.

Plot summary

Tibby Rollins
Ten years following the last sisterhood book, Tibby has moved to Australia with Brian and now has almost no contact with the three other girls. Soon after moving to Australia, Tibby learns that she is not only pregnant but she is also diagnosed with a terminal disease. Nearly two years after giving birth to her daughter, Bailey, she calls her friends together for one last trip to Greece. Disaster strikes when she suddenly dies in a swimming accident on the shores in Greece leaving her friends, Lena, Bridget, and Carmen, devastated, and with the belief that she committed suicide, they begin to questioning everything that they believe in.

It is revealed through the novel that Tibby was suffering from Huntington's disease and aware that she was going to die, even though her death by drowning was an accident. When she invited the girls to Greece she was going to reveal this and give them letters to help them move on. It is later revealed that she discovered she had the disease when she found she was pregnant with her daughter Bailey whom she had with Brian. Her final gift to Lena, Carmen, and Bridget is willing them to move on and follow their hearts because life is too short to waste.

Lena Kaligaris
Ten years into the future, Lena is an art teacher at the Rhode Island School of Design, casually dating a sandwich maker named Drew, and still obsessing over Kostos. Lena goes back to Greece for a reunion with her friends and after discovering Tibby died, she asks Kostos for help with Tibby’s death. As they talk, they rekindle a friendship. They start writing to each other again and realizing she’s not afraid of his love, eventually end up together at the end of the book.

Bridget Vreeland
Ten years following the last sisterhood book, Bridget now lives in San Francisco, California with her longtime boyfriend, Eric. She wants to settle down with him and get married, but a part of her is restless. When the "sisters" go to Greece and Tibby dies unexpectedly, Bridget leaves Eric, and soon after finds out she is pregnant with his child. Despite this, she knows she needs to go to Australia where Tibby had been living together with Brian to at least try to piece together what exactly happened to Tibby. Bridget goes to the home Brian and Tibby lived in Australia, and Bridget learns Tibby had a daughter before she died, named Bailey. Bridget and Bailey form a very tight bond, and though she initially wants to terminate her pregnancy, after she meets Bailey she decides not to. On April 2, when all the sisters are due to reunite in the country home Tibby bought for all of them, Bridget reunites with Eric and moves into the icehouse, along with Lena and Carmen, who have rooms elsewhere about the property.

Carmen Lowell
Carmen is a semi-successful actress in New York who is engaged to a sometimes pretentious man her friends dislike. She is now obsessed with her work, worries about her wedding and her busy schedule. On her long trip to an audition, she meets a man named Roberto Moyo who is traveling with his two young children. Carmen befriends Roberto and is struck by his sad story, she also grows very fond of his kids. At the end of the book, Carmen breaks off her engagement. She is the only one of her friends who is not romantically involved with anyone; however, she is very satisfied with her life.

References

External links

The Official "Sisterhood" site

2011 American novels
American novels adapted into films
American young adult novels
Delacorte Press books